Pu is an Indian given name shared by several people, including:

 Pu Laldenga (c. 1930–1990), Chief Minister of Mizoram state in northeastern India from 1986 till 1988
 Pu Lalhmingthanga (born 1940), chief of the Mizoram People's Conference
 Pu Lalthanhawla (born 1942), Chief Minister of Mizoram since 2008
 Pu Ziona (born 1944/1945), head of Pu Chana páwl, a Christian sect formed in June 1942 in Mizoram state of India
 Pu Zoduha (1940–2013), Indian politician
 Pu Zoramthanga (born 1944), Chief Minister of Mizoram, India, from December 1998 to December 2008

See also
Pu (disambiguation)